This is a list of murdered American children that details notable murders among thousands of cases of subjects who were or are believed to have been under the age of 18 upon their deaths. Cases listed are stated to be unsolved, solved or pending and, in some cases, where the victims' remains have never been found or identified.

Before 1950

1950s

1960s

1970s

1980s

1990s

2000s

2010s

2020s

See also
 List of unidentified decedents in the United States
 Parents of Murdered Children Memorial

References

Death in the United States-related lists
Lists of victims of crimes
Children
 
Murdered children
American children